Jim Evans, sometimes known as T.A.Z., is an American painter, printmaker, and creative director who was a contributing figure in the visual art movement known as underground comix. After a successful career as a comic illustrator, Evans worked as a painter, poster maker, and owner of the digital design group Division 13.

Biography

Early life
Evans was born in San Diego amidst the surfing culture of southern California. After attending Oceanside High School, he played in several local bands and then created comic strips for the Los Angeles Free Press and other underground papers while working for Eric Matlen's Sawyer Press. Evans then began to take commissions doing work in several comic books. These included Yellow Dog, and a solo effort titled The Dying Dolphin, released by the Berkeley-based Print Mint, it included collaborations with Rick Griffin and Ron Cobb. Evans also drew for Slow Death Funnies, and Tales from the Tube, which was published by Surfer Magazine, and included contributions by Zap Comix artists Robert Crumb, Spain Rodriguez, Robert Williams, and Rick Griffin.

Hawaii
The Underground period was followed by a move to the North Shore of Oahu, and contributions to both Surfer and Surfing magazines, as well as illustrating a succession of surfing posters, such as Hal Jepson's "A Sea For Yourself", and the posters for Bud Browne's successful "Going Surfin'" series.  He did posters for many Australian surf films like On Any Morning, and A Winter's Tale.  During this period, he also did posters for Oahu's Crater Celebration, featuring bands like Santana and Little Feat.  Some of the time in Hawaii was spent doing commercial and advertising art for ad agencies, including ads and record sleeves for Don Ho and the Allihis, and The Society of Seven.

Album art
Returning to the mainland, Evans began to do record sleeves and continued his relationship with Surfer and Surfing magazines, doing numerous illustrations for both, including a collaboration with surfer Mike Doyle on a series of ads for Wax Research.  Evans also contributed regularly to Skateboarder and Powder magazines.  Working with Dean Torrance of Jan & Dean fame, he did the art for their revival album, Dead Man's Curve, and a compilation of Jan & Dean and Beach Boys hits called Golden Summer.  In collaboration with Dean, Evans also did the art for the Beach Boys albums 15 Big Ones, and Live in London.  At the same time, he created a logo for The Beach Boys that is still used.  This, in turn, led to the commission to create a logo for the band Chicago.  His list of album jackets includes; Alice Coltrane, The Robby Kreiger Band, Chicago, The Allman Brothers, Neil Young, The Beach Boys, Beastie Boys, Beck, House of Pain, Symbol Six, Face To Face, and Toto.

In addition to the record sleeves and ongoing work with the surfing magazines, Evans became a contributor to the newly formed Skateboarder magazine, handling all of the illustration work for the first four issues. Jim also collaborated with Frank Nasworthy on a series of ads for Cadillac Wheels, the first polyurethane skateboard wheel. The posters, with titles like, "From Out of the West" and "Accept No Substitutes" came to represent the paradigm shift taking place in skateboarding. Other skate art commissions included one for filmmaker / skater Stacy Peralta, for an early skate film titled Freestylin''', as well as the poster for the first World Professional Skateboard Championships.

Evans worked with  producer Kevin Shirley to do the album art and packaging design for Joe Bonamassa’s Live at the Greek Theater.Film posters
The period of record sleeves and skate posters ran parallel to commissions for a number of film posters.  Working for most of the major studios, Jim completed art for Lumiere, 20th Century Oz, I Never Promised You a Rose Garden, Kentucky Fried Movie, Big Wednesday, Herowork, Acapulco Gold, The Space Movie, Patrick, Neil Young's Rust Never Sleeps (for which Jim also animated the opening title sequence), and John Carpenter's first film Dark Star. Numerous books began to appear at this time and his work is included in the History of Rock Art, Phonographics, Roger Dean's Album Art Book, and The History of Underground Comics. An interest in film led to work as an Art Director, set decorator, and storyboard artist for films. Evans worked on Killer's Kiss and Growing Pains. He also helped to prepare an American release for a series of Japanese films called The Baby Cart Series. Working with director Robert Houston and his partner David Weisman, Jim created the poster and title treatment for the 1980 release titled Shogun Assassin, Jim's son Gibran Evans voiced the narrative as Daigoro. An ongoing creative collaboration with John Hegeman, president of Orion Pictures, led to Jim illustrating promotional posters for the SAW films for Lionsgate, The Green Inferno for BH Tilt, the film Mirrors for New Regency, Anna And the Apocalypse and a poster-centric street art image for Child's Play.

Fine art
An association with Playboy led to a series of silkscreen portraits of celebrities. The magazine commissioned Evans to do portraits of Sean Connery, David Letterman, Joe Montana, and Marilyn Monroe. These portraits led to art shows in Chicago and New York, in addition to a large scale show at the Hansen Gallery Rodeo Drive location, where he did portraits of Sly Stallone, Madonna, Arnold Schwarzenegger, Billy Idol, Steve Vai, Bob Dylan, and Robert Mitchum. Later a show of feminist icons, done in collaboration with pop artist Richard Duardo, had a successful run at the Zero One gallery in Los Angeles. Evans' art has been shown at The Nyehaus gallery, Metro Pictures and Friedrich Petzel Gallery in New York, for a bi-coastal tour called "Swell". Other artists in the show included Billy Al Bengston, Ed Ruscha, Laddie John Dill, and Dennis Hopper.  
Evans’ work was included in a group show titled "The Lords and the New Creatures" at the NYE+BROWN gallery, which also featured Judy Chicago, Ed Moses, and Chris Burden.  In addition, work from Evans's comic and illustration period were included in the "Paid To Play" show at the Robert Berman Gallery, which also featured John Van Hamersveld and Dave Willardson. Both of these shows were part of the Los Angeles-based Pacific Standard Time: Art In L.A. 1945-1980 initiative.

A group show at WAAS Gallery in Dallas titled, “Collect / Respect" featured Evans' work in addition to Sebastian Walker, Restoration Press, Gregory Siff, and SLICK.

A collaboration with artist Ned Evans led to the creation of the TAZBONES team, and a two-man show at the ICON Gallery in Los Angeles. It featured a series of fantasy surf-posters and was called “The No Shows 1972-1999.” This collaboration was later included in a show at the Harwood Museum Of Art in Taos, NM titled, "¡Orale! Kings and Queens of Cool.” This show also included the work of Gary Baseman, and Joe Coleman.

In 2014 a one-man show celebrating Evans' early work was mounted by the Palm Springs Modernism Week in conjunction with Gallery 446 and Eddie Donaldson, it was titled, “MODERNISM: The Art Of The Pop Portrait - Jim Evans 1984-1986." This period of work was also showcased at the Level Gallery in Dallas, TX in a show titled, “The Art Of The Pop Portrait - Jim Evans 1984-1989.”

Jim Evans / TAZ presented solo works as well as collaborations with RISK (Graffiti Artist) at the Buckshot Gallery in Santa Monica, CA in a show titled, “Unconventional Forces." Jim Evans / TAZ followed up by working with RISK and photographer Dennis Morris on a pair of limited-edition prints celebrating The Sex Pistols and Peter Tosh.

T.A.Z. rock posters
In the late 1980s, Evans turned his attention back to rock music. Agreeing to do a poster for Nirvana and L7 for a Rock for Choice benefit, he created a new moniker, T.A.Z.  The name was inspired by Hakim Bey's anarchist handbook titled The Temporary Autonomous Zone, This began collaboration with Jim, Gibran Evans, and silkscreen artist Rolo Castillo.[14] During the 90's they created over 200 silkscreen limited edition rock posters for bands such as U2, Jane's Addiction, Oasis, Pearl Jam, Smashing Pumpkins, Metallica, and the Beastie Boys.[15] As a group, T.A.Z. has completed commissions for numerous record sleeves. These include the Beastie Boys, Beck, Aerosmith, Face to Face, House of Pain, The Voodoo Glow Skulls, Slayer, Luscious Jackson, and Orange 9mm. The creation of T.A.Z. led to Jim's association with the Lollapalooza festival, and the Tibetan Freedom Concerts. In 1994, he was commissioned by Marc Geiger and Perry Farrell to decorate the Lollapalooza festival.[16]. The T.A.Z. collective branched out into film posters with the 10th Anniversary poster for the SAW franchise, American Ultra, a series for Eli Roth’s Green Inferno, and a Teenage Mutant Ninja Turtles Limited Edition. T.A.Z. as a group also continues to do rock posters, commissions include, Pearl Jam, Foo Fighters, Blink-182, Queens Of The Stone Age, Bad Religion, and Anderson .Paak. A recent issue of CAMP, the Coachella magazine featured an interview with Evans and poster artist Emek. Flood Magazine commissioned T.A.Z. to do a cover and interior illustration for activist rapper M.I.A. to coincide with the release of her documentary Matangi/Maya/M.I.A. Other T.A.Z. collaborators include, Ariel Celestino, Kirk Canning, and Omaha Perez.[17]

Digital media
The move into electronic media led to the founding of The Big Gun Project. The Big Gun Project was conceived as a loosely organized artistic electronic commune made up of artists, designers, writers, and computer programmers. The Big Gun Project was responsible for creating early websites such as The Crash Site, FilmZone, and Salvo. The Big Gun Project's work-for-hire initiatives led to the completion of many web sites for major motion pictures. Among them, Men in Black, Tomorrow Never Dies, Seven, Jackie Chan's Rumble in the Bronx, The Mummy, The Big Lebowski, and Fear and Loathing in Las Vegas, which was done in collaboration with the film director Terry Gilliam. On the music side, the Big Gun Project built web sites for The Beastie Boys, The Ozzfest, Grand Royal Records, and The Tibetan Freedom Concert.

In the late 1990s Evans worked as the Executive Creative Director for Al Teller's online label Atomic Pop. He was in charge of interface design, content creation, web site development for artists signed to the label, and interactive game design. While at Atomic Pop he created sites, videos, and games, for Public Enemy, Ice-T, The Black Eyed Peas, and Smashing Pumpkins.

Current
Evans resides in Malibu with his wife and business partner Nancy Lucas Evans. He is the Executive Creative Director and owner of the Division 13 Design Group, a web-based design firm specializing in the collaboration of art and technology. With clients like Sony Pictures, DreamWorks Animation, Lionsgate, Orion Pictures, Universal, Paramount, and Warner Bros, he does web sites, marketing campaigns, games, apps, videos, animations, and poster art for films. Titles he has worked on include Kung Fu Panda, Madagascar, How To Train Your Dragon, Shrek, Ice Age, the SAW series, The Ring, Star Trek Beyond, Angry Birds, Don’t Breathe, and Teenage Mutant Ninja Turtles: Out of the Shadows''.

Works

Film Projects
 Jumanji: The Next Level
 Zombieland: Double Tap
 Once Upon A Time in Hollywood
 MIB - International
 Rocketman
 Lego Movie 2: The Second Part
 Teen Titans
 Venom
 Mission: Impossible - Fallout
 The Emoji Movie
 Star Trek Beyond
 Angry Birds
 Don't Breathe
 Star Trek
 Trolls
 Home
 The Darkness
 Green Inferno
 American Ultra
 Freeheld
 The Hunger Games: Mockingjay Part 1
 Paddington
 Fury
 Penguins Of Madagascar
 Mr. Peabody & Sherman
 Turbo
 The Nut Job
 Puss in Boots
 Real Steel
 In Time
 The Croods
 Shrek Forever After
 Ice Age 3: Dawn of the Dinosaurs
 Monsters Vs. Aliens
 Kung Fu Panda I, II
 Saw, Saw III, Saw V, Saw 3D
 Hellboy I, II
 Mirrors
 DreamWorks Animation
 Shrek The Third
 Dreamgirls
 Madagascar I, III
 Lord of War
 Over The Hedge
 Flags Of Our Fathers
 The Terminal
 Catch Me If You Can
 Shark Tale
 XXX: State of the Union
 The Ring 1, 2
 League Of Extraordinary Gentlemen
 Fear And Loathing In Las Vegas
 The Big Lebowski
 Men In Black
 Psycho
 Seven

Film posters
 Jumanji: The Next Level
 Zombieland: Double Tap
 Once Upon A Time In Hollywood
 Jigsaw (IMAX)
 American Ultra (Comic-Con Exclusive)
 SAW (10th Anniversary Edition)
 Tank Girl
 Kentucky Fried Movie
 Big Wednesday
 Mustang Ranch
 Dark Star
 Rust Never Sleeps
 Shogun Assassin
 Acapulco Gold
 20th Century Oz
 The Space Movie
 Kentucky Fried Movie
 I Never Promised You A Rose Garden
 Lumiere
 Herowork

Music posters
 Anderson .Paak
 Blink-182
 Band Of Horses
 Queens Of The Stone Age
 House Of Pain
 Nirvana
 Beck
 The Melvins
 Rage Against The Machine
 Smashing Pumpkins
 Green Day
 Lollapalooza
 Foo Fighters
 U2
 Tibetan Freedom Concert
 Nine Inch Nails
 Pearl Jam
 Metallica
 The Ramones
 Sonic Youth
 Jane's Addiction
 Beastie Boys
 Wu-Tang Clan
 L7
 Bad Religion
 Oasis
 Bob Dylan 
 311

Album art
 Live at the Greek Theater, Joe Bonamassa 
 Live Rust - Neil Young,
 Ill Communication - Beastie Boys
 15 Big Ones - The Beach Boys
 Wipe the Windows, Check the Oil, Dollar Gas - The Allman Brothers
 Live In London - The Beach Boys
 Robby Krieger & Friends - Robby Krieger
 Big Choice -  Face to Face
 Truth Crushed To Earth Shall Rise Again - House of Pain
 Who Is, This Is - Voodoo Glow Skulls
 Driver Not Included - Orange 9mm
 Falling In Between - Toto
 Stereopathetic Soulmanure - Beck
 Ptah, the El Daoud - Alice Coltrane

References

External links
 Club of the Waves - Surf Artist - Jim Evans
 SAW 10th Anniversary Poster by TAZ - Jim Evans
 Future Man - Originally printed in Surfer’s Journal
 Swell Redux article in Man Of The World and RIPP online
 Swell - Art in America
 Vegas Seven - Low to High Brow
 ART SABOTAGE - T.A.Z.
 Beastiemania.com - Interviews T.A.Z.
 Lambiek.net - Jim Evans
 Liquid Salt Surfing Magazine - Jim Evans Interview

American contemporary painters
20th-century American painters
American male painters
21st-century American painters
American photographers
American storyboard artists
Artists from San Diego
1950 births
Living people
Underground comix
Album-cover and concert-poster artists
Film poster artists
20th-century American printmakers
20th-century American male artists